Calverley Old Hall is a medieval manor house with Grade I listed building status situated at Calverley, West Yorkshire, England.

Architectural features
Significant portions of the house have unusually escaped alteration and modernisation in later centuries. The oldest section of the property is the solar, believed to be of 14th-century origin. The great hall, which has an interesting six-bay hammerbeam roof, and the chapel have been dated to 1485–1495. Later additions include an accommodation wing added in the early 16th century by Sir William Calverley to house his very large family.

During routine work on the Hall in 2021, colour was seen beneath a small piece of plaster removed from "an undistinguished little bedroom". Further work revealed three walls covered with painting of a very high standard in the Tudor equivalent of wallpaper, "grotesque work" based on Roman emperor Nero's Golden villa. Such painting was often painted over and destroyed, but these were preserved by being covered in plaster.

Calverley family
The Calverley family settled in Calverley in ancient times and remained for several hundred years. Walter Calverley (1483-1536), was knighted at Lille in October 1513 following the battle of the Spurs.

The hall was witness to dreadful violence in April 1605, when Walter Calverley murdered two of his sons, William and Walter, after drinking heavily. He was tried in York for murder but refused to plead and was therefore pressed to death. Because of his refusal his property could not be seized by the state and passed to his surviving baby son, Henry. The case inspired two Jacobean plays:
The Miseries of Enforced Marriage by George Wilkins (published 1607). This fictionalised treatment of the case deals with events prior to the murders and provides a happy ending.
A Yorkshire Tragedy. This belongs to a different genre from the other play and has been described as "domestic tragedy" or "true crime". The authorship was attributed to William Shakespeare in the first printed edition (1608) but it is now thought to have been written by Thomas Middleton.

In the mid-17th century Walter Calverley (b. 1629) married Francis Thompson, heiress of the Thompson estate at Esholt. In 1709 their son, Walter, built a new mansion house on the site of Esholt Priory and the family left Calverley. After his death in 1749 the family sold the Esholt estate and in 1754 sold the Calverley properties to the Thornhills. Thereafter the hall remained under a single landlord but was subdivided into cottages.
The chapel was let out as a wheelwright's shop.

Conservation
In 1981 the Landmark Trust bought the property and converted a 17th-century block for use as holiday accommodation. Full restoration of the site, including the great hall and solar wing, has been a long-term project because of life tenancies. Meanwhile, part of the site is deemed to be heritage at risk, subject to gradual decay pending completion of the restoration. The aim of the Trust is to provide space for community use as well as holiday accommodation.

See also
Grade I listed buildings in West Yorkshire
Listed buildings in Calverley and Farsley

References

External links

Landmark Trust Website
   West Yorkshire Archaeology Service

Country houses in West Yorkshire
Landmark Trust properties in England
Grade I listed houses
Grade I listed buildings in Leeds
Structures on the Heritage at Risk register